Parental leave in the United States (also known as family leave) is regulated by US labor law and state law. The Family and Medical Leave Act of 1993 (FMLA) requires 12 weeks of unpaid leave annually for mothers of newborn or newly adopted children if they work for a company with 50 or more employees. As of October 1, 2020, the same policy has been extended to caregivers of sick family members, or a partner in direct relation to the birth of the child therefore responsible for the care of the mother. Although 12 weeks are allowed to them, on average American fathers only take 10 days off, due to financial need. Taking paternity leave is not the norm, due to lack of paternity leave allotted to fellow employees previously in the same situation since the policy change is relatively new. Beginning in 2020, California, New Jersey, and Rhode Island required paid parental leave to employees, including those a part of 50 or less employees. For the majority of US workers at companies with fewer than 50 employees, there is no legal requirement for paid or unpaid leave to care for a new child or recover from childbirth but some US states do require this.

That is below the 16-week minimum recommended by the World Health Organization. The United States is the only country among the 38 member OECD nations that has not passed laws requiring businesses and corporations to offer paid maternity leave to their employees.

History
Between 1961 and 1965, only 14% of mothers participated in the workforce within six months of their child's birth. During the same period, only 44% of mothers worked during their pregnancy.

Until the enactment of FMLA, in 1993, maternity leave coverage was governed by state law, collective bargaining agreements, and employer policies. The first set of maternity leave related policies emerged after World War I, when first-wave feminists lobbied for a women's health bill to give grants to states to provide healthcare for women and children. By 1969, five states had enacted temporary disability insurance laws to protect employees from income loss in the occurrence of a temporary medical disability. Under that legislation, new mothers were granted leaves corresponding to the benefits that other employees received for temporary illness or disability. Changes to the federal tax code in 1976 permitted working families with a dependent child to take a tax credit on child care costs. In 1978, the Pregnancy Discrimination Act (PDA) prohibited employers from treating a woman unfavorably because of pregnancy, childbirth, or a medical condition related to pregnancy or childbirth. A landmark case in 1987, California Federal Savings and Loan Association v. Guerra, upheld a California law requiring most employers to grant pregnant women four months of unpaid disability leave and the right to return to the same job. That state-level trend of maternity leave legislation continued into the 1970s and 1980s where multiple other states passed more explicit recognitions of new mothers' rights to a temporary leave of absence. Ultimately, 12 states and the District of Columbia had implemented measures requiring at least some private sector employers to offer maternity leave packages to its employees. Even in the absence of the formal legislation, employees in other states often obtained maternity leave by collective bargaining. Employees frequently held enough bargaining power to influence employer policies and to negotiate for the inclusion of maternity leave protection.

Despite some localized employees' access to maternity leave, there was growing pressure for national maternity leave legislation in the early 1990s. Many new mothers continued to be excluded from such maternity leave provisions despite growing national demand. Women now enjoyed greater employment opportunities and changing gender norms that encouraged increased labor involvement. That increased female employment also extended to mothers, who now were now more likely to engage in the workforce even if they had a young child. The labor participation rate of mothers with children aged less than one rose from 31% in 1976 to 54% in 1992. The contribution of women's earnings to her family income rose from 26.6% in 1970 to 36% in 2008. In spite of a high labor force participation rate, only an estimated 40% of working women had access to explicit maternity leave protection. That inadequate national coverage provoked intense protest and growing national consensus on the value of maternity leave. Ultimately, the increased salience and galvanized national support prompted the enactment of the Family and Medical Leave Act of 1993, mandating maternity leave.

Although the Family and Medical Leave Act required employers to guarantee job-protected, unpaid leave up to 12 weeks after the birth or adoption of a new child, an estimated 41% of employees in the United States were not covered by Act in 2012. Nearly two-thirds of mothers had to work during their pregnancies between 2002 and 2008. By 2012, only 14% of US fathers had access to paid family leave as an employee benefit. About two thirds of employees (68%) had access to paid sick leave, and 38% had access to short-term disability benefits. Prior to the FMLA, the term "family" referred to a nuclear family where with two parents of opposite sex and the "mother" could bear a child. That was the only definition acknowledged by medical and economic research done before the LGBTQ rights movement. Only recently have studies caught up to a modern and more inclusive definition for a family.

Current legislation
In the US, parents and family are federally protected under the 1993 Family and Medical Leave Act (FMLA) to go on maternity or family leave after the adoption or birth of a child. Under this law, legal parents are protected for up to 12 weeks of unpaid leave (per year). The FMLA ensures the job security of parents/employees but does not protect employees who go on paid leave with their employers. Receiving the correct payment from being on leave is between the firm and the employee. However, some states have laws that do protect and guarantee employees for paid family leave (see State Legislation section). Additionally, the FMLA defines "parents" as biological, adoptive, step or foster parent who stood in loco parentis or "in the place of a parent". Parents do not include parents-in-law.

This paragraph is for employees who are seeking to get paid using their firm's extended policies on leaves. If employees choose to go on maternity or family leave, The Employee's Guide to Family and Medical Leave Act states that they can sometimes use their unspent sick time, vacation time, personal time, etc., saved up with their employer at the same time of their FMLA leave so that they continue to get paid. In order to use such leave, "you must follow your employer's normal leave rules such as submitting a leave form or providing advance notice. Even if you don't want to use your paid leave, your employer can require you to use it during your FMLA leave".

If employees choose to use the FMLA to go on regular unpaid leave without any extended or paid leave, the FMLA has several limiting stipulations and leaves out certain employee's conditions such as temp workers and trans employees, so only certain employees are eligible. In order to receive maternity leave protections under FMLA, employees must:

work for a covered employer;
have worked 1,250 hours during the 12 months prior to the start of leave; (special hours of service rules apply to airline flight crew members)
work at a location where the employer has 50 or more employees within 75 miles; and
have worked for the employer for 12 months.

The 12 months of employment are not required to be consecutive in order for the employee to qualify for FMLA leave. In general, only employment within seven years is counted unless the break in service is (1) due to an employee's fulfilment of military obligations, or (2) governed by a collective bargaining agreement or other written agreement.

The FMLA is the only law that federally protects American employees who go on maternity or family leave their resumed job security. It was signed into law during President Bill Clinton's first term in 1993 and revised on February 23, 2015 to include same-sex parents and spouses. Two other Federal laws, the Pregnancy Discrimination Act (PDA) and the Patient Protection and Affordable Care Act's (PPACA, also known as the Affordable Care Act, the ACA or Obamacare) amendment of the Fair Labor Standards Act, provide some additional protection for parents on the birth of a child. For instance, the PDA upholds maternity leave by arguing that employees who give temporarily disabled folks a disability leave should give pregnant women maternity leave with the same protections and benefits. This PDA is essentially arguing that pregnant women should have rights to the same paid or unpaid leave that temporarily disabled workers are afforded by their employers. If an employer offers this protection to temporarily disabled workers then PDA says that pregnant women should also be protected using the same processes and same benefits. Additionally, in 2014 the PPACA amendment to the Fair Labor Standards Act made it so that all insurance companies had to include maternity coverage in individual insurance plans. Therefore, filling the gap for unemployed women with individual insurance coverage plans to be able to afford the prenatal and postnatal pregnancy care that they need to have a healthy baby. Maternity care came to include:

Outpatient services, such as prenatal and postnatal doctor visits, gestational diabetes screenings, lab studies, medications, etc.
Inpatient services, such as hospitalization, physician fees, etc.
Newborn baby care
Lactation counselling and breast-pump rental
 
These federal laws and amendments have increased accessibility and quality of care for prenatal and postnatal mothers and families. For example, before the Affordable Care Act, only 12% of insurance plans sold in the individual market included maternity coverage. Also, according to a journal study on FMLA by researchers at the University of Maryland, it was found that mothers who benefitted from FMLA were returned to the same job and sooner than before FMLA thus showing the impact of job stability for mothers. Nonetheless, many employees are still ineligible for the FMLA. According to the Family and Medical Leave Report in 2012, only 59% of American employees were eligible under the FMLA. Additionally, employees who returned after FMLA, women exclusively, were given lower wages than the ones to when they left. This comes from the same study by researchers at the University of Maryland, as aforementioned. It should be said that these lower wages may have not been permanent since the study only went to highlight women's experience with maternity leave two years after they leave.
 
In recent polls from 2017, Democrats and Republicans both are in high support of federal funding for paid maternity and family leave. According to a study done by the Brookings Institution, a non-profit think tank in D.C., 71% of Republicans and 83% of Democrats support for a paid leave policy. Although the study did not reach a particular compromise on how the policies should work, who should pay for it, how much, and other concerns that might factor into creating a universal paid parental leave policy, it reached a conclusion. Among the diverse group of researchers with different political and economic views, everyone believed that it is worthwhile to consider a federal paid leave policy. One reason is that the "USis the only advanced country that provides no public support to new parents."
 
The US does not have a federal paid maternity and family leave act. Some states, however, include paid leave legislation for family members. States like California, New Jersey, and New York have pioneered paid leave legislature in their respective states. Reasons for paid leave might include higher job security for women and to reduce women's need for public assistance. A study by the Institute for Women's Research has also shown that paid leave could reduce employer costs and lead to US economic growth. Also, paid family leave has been shown to increase the health of the family by lowering infant mortality rates. Paid family leave would also allow low-income families the ability to take care of their family members without having to sacrifice time and money. Reasons for not having a protected paid family leave policy in place might be justified by the fact that there are limited economic resources to sustain a program. Additionally, some may disagree with the overreach of the government in taking on the responsibility to keep families afloat on leave. Compared to some other countries, the US remains behind in terms of maternity leave legislature.

State legislation
Many states have supplemented these federal regulations and provided more extensive maternity leave benefits, including expanding paid or flexible sick time, expanding access for workers in smaller companies or with less time on the job, right to pump that expands on federal law, and pregnancy accommodations.

As of 2016, 12 states have enacted no additional laws or programs to support family leave before or after birth. Fourteen states, along with the District of Columbia, have addressed eligibility requirements by lowering the firm-size threshold from 50 or more employees down to as low as 10 employees. Seven other states, in addition to the District of Columbia, have adopted more generous maternity leave lengths that allow longer absences for the purpose of child-rearing. Moreover, some states have enacted legislation enhancing the benefits of leave programs.

California, New Jersey, and Rhode Island for instance, operate programs that require private-sector employers to pay their employees who utilize maternity leave at partial replacement rates. New York passed paid family leave legislation, which includes maternity leave, in 2016—starting off at 8 weeks and 50% of pay in 2018, and reaching 12 weeks and 67% of pay in 2021.

Hawaii, Puerto Rico, and the District of Columbia designate childbirth as a temporary disability thus guaranteeing mothers paid maternity leave through Disability Insurance (TDI) provisions.

On Dec. 31, 2019, New Mexico Governor Michelle Lujan Grisham signed an executive order installing paid family leave for state employees, the first such policy in the state. The order, providing 12 weeks of paid family leave for state employees under the Governor's direct purview, became effective January 1, 2020.

On January 1, 2022 Connecticut enacted the a policy allowing 16 weeks of parental leave per year should any unforeseen changes or issues arise during the birth.

Currently, Oregon protects 12 weeks of leave for parents following a birth; However, it is unpaid time unless sick days or vacation days are used for it. The state has announced a reformed parental leave law set to be put in place in 2023. The new law promises paid leave following births as well as the ability to be granted an additional 12 week paid parent leave paid leave if there is a complication to the mother as a result of birth, or a complication with the child's health. This new law will be applied to all employers with 25 or more employees. Unlike most other state's  programs for parental leave, Oregon includes protection for paid paternity leave as well as maternity leave in the new policy.

As of 2022, Washington, Connecticut, California, Hawaii, Oregon, Puerto Rico, Washington DC, Colorado, New Mexico, New York, Massachusetts, and New Jersey have all enacted laws requiring paid family and medical leave laws beyond just the basic federal laws.

The presence of strong labor unions and Democratic control of state houses increases the likelihood that state legislatures support parental leave legislation.

Other federal policies 
The Department of Defense has regulated the amount of maternity leave a military member can take. Before February 5, 2016 the leave was six weeks long for active duty members or reservists who had previously done twelve months of active duty time. On January 28, 2016, the Defense Secretary, Ashton Carter, increased the paid maternity leave to twelve weeks for all branches. Traditional reservists, however, are given an eighty-four-day excusal, not leave.

In the United States Air Force AFI36-3003, it states that the maternity leave starts after being released from the hospital from giving birth, as also defined for other branches. "Shared benefits" can be created if both parents are active Air Force members. Therefore, a sum of up to twelve weeks can be taken by one parent or distributed amongst the two parents. However, two married active-duty members cannot create "shared benefits" in the Army, according to the Army Directive 2016-09 (Maternity Leave Policy).

There was a stance by the previous Secretary of the Navy, Ray Mabus, to increase the maternity leave from six to eighteen weeks for the Navy and Marine Corps beginning on July 2, 2015. It was implemented until January 28, 2016, however, it remained eighteen weeks for those who were pregnant previous to and on March 3, 2016.

It was a significant leap to go from six to twelve weeks of maternity leave. Other benefits have also been increased to improve the lives of those with newborn or newly adopted children. These benefits include an increase of child care hours to fourteen hours a day, and allowing active duty members more ability to family plan by paying for the sperm and egg freezing. These decisions were made by the previous Defense Secretary "in an effort to support military families, improve retention and strengthen the force of the future."

On December 20, 2019, as part of the National Defense Authorization Act (NDAA) for Fiscal Year 2020, the Federal Employee Paid Leave Act (FEPLA) amended the  Family and Medical Leave Act (FMLA)  to grant federal government employees up to 12 weeks of paid time off for the birth, adoption or foster of a new child. The law applies to births or placements occurring on or after October 1, 2020.

Impacts

Health

Child health and development

Longer maternity leave (up to 25 weeks) is associated with a reduction in post-neonatal and child mortality. A 2017 study found that there was almost a 50% reduction in the probability of infant rehospitalization when women took maternity leave that was partially and fully paid. According to data from the 2006–2010 U.S. National Survey of Family Growth, paid maternity leave of 3 or more months for employed mothers is associated with a higher chance of the mother starting breastfeeding and breastfeeding her child at six months. The American Academy of Pediatrics (AAP) currently recommends six months of breastfeeding exclusively, and continued breastfeeding as foods are introduced for one year for its medical and neurodevelopmental benefits for the child. Mothers who are not engaged in employment may be more able to participate in consistent breast-feeding, since maternal employment can interfere with breastfeeding. The Center for Disease Control and Prevention states asthma, obesity, Sudden infant death syndrome, type 2 diabetes, gastrointestinal infections, and certain infections are all less likely to occur in breastfed babies. Research suggests that breast-feeding has the ability to yield substantial child health improvements in disease prevention and immune system build-up. Moreover, further evidence indicates that maternal care is especially crucial during the first couple of months following child birth, or the time in which American maternity leave is in effect. Finally, evidence shows that paid maternity leave plans can increase paternal involvement in child care as shown by California's state paid maternity leave program.

Parental health
The medical definition of postpartum is the time frame between childbirth and the return of the gestational parent's reproductive organs to their non pregnant state. For people that return to work during this postpartum period, the stress of maintaining a balance between their professional and parenting responsibilities has been shown to weaken their immune systems and interact poorly with their psychological state. Lower rates of breastfeeding may also have negative effects on the parent's health, as breastfeeding lowers the possibility of breast cancer, ovarian cancer, type 2 diabetes, and heart disease for the parent. People of color and people classified as high economic hardship report postpartum symptoms more frequently and for a longer duration than people not in these categories. This trend is observed with both physical and mental health symptoms. Parental leave over a longer time period is associated with an increase in the health of both the mother and the child. Paid leave with a duration of over 12 weeks is correlated with a decrease in the risk of infant and parental re-hospitalization. According to a study on cisgender mothers of 6-month old infants using data from the National Institute of Child Health and Human Development, mothers who worked more hours experienced higher levels of depressive symptoms and stress due to parenting. They also viewed their personal health as worse when they worked more hours in the time period after childbirth. Parental l-infant separation may cause significant parental stress, depression, and anxiety. Researchers propose paid leave relates to health as it allows women to recover from childbirth and take care of themselves, attend to their infant, visit the hospital for prenatal checkups, wellness, and illness, and manage finances.

Postpartum depression 
Among other factors, pregnancy can be a cause of depression in women. Postpartum depression usually develops within 4–6 weeks after birth, however delayed postpartum depression can also take up to 18 months to manifest for some women. Symptoms of postpartum depression include a loss of interest in activities, difficulty focusing, thinking, making decisions, and remembering things, anxiety, irritation, slowed speaking, physical pains, and feelings of sadness and worthlessness. In industrial societies, postpartum depression is considered a major public health concern and affects about 15% of women. Postpartum depression also has negative developmental consequences for the child. Research indicates 12 weeks may not be a long enough leave duration for those at risk of developing postpartum depression. As stated earlier, it can take up to 18 months to develop postpartum depression and it affects each individuals differently; the limited time frame maternity leave offers isn't substantial enough to address its potential health issues. Fewer occurrences of depressive symptoms are correlated to longer maternity leave. A study using data from the Early Childhood Longitudinal Study - Birth Cohort indicates there is a lower likelihood of women developing severe depression  and increased overall health if women take longer maternity leave from work. In addition, more depressive symptoms occurred in mothers postpartum when the spouse did not take any paternal leave. Poor physical health of the mother during the postpartum period is associated with more depressive symptoms, making postnatal health, in addition to employment, a prevalent factor when considering mental health in new mothers. Negative physical health symptoms frequently reported included tiredness, back pain, and back problems. Negative physical health symptoms frequently reported included tiredness, back pain, and back problems. Furthermore, postpartum death is a prevalent issue as half of pregnancy-related deaths take place after women give birth.

These mental health issues have the biggest toll on women from low-income and marginalized communities. There is a sub-facet within the American Rescue Plan Act of 2021 that extends Medicaid care for postpartum related issues. This policy reveals how important it is for mothers and their infants to have access to care for maternal mental health. However, it is a separate policy from the FMLA and women will not have extended parental leave in order to focus on their mental health concerns. FMLA provides 12 weeks of unpaid leave, which only further negatively impacts women with low socioeconomic status seeking mental health care.

Economic

Economic efficiency
Five states currently offer paid family leave: California, Massachusetts, Georgia, New Jersey, and Rhode Island. In New Jersey, women who took paid leave in the year after giving birth were 40% less likely to receive public aid or food stamps. According to a California-based study, 87% of employers reported that the paid leave requirement did not increase costs; 9% note that it saved money due to decreased turnover and other costs.

In the United States, $40 million is spent annually on the re-hospitalization of preterm infants. In addition, each maternal re-hospitalization adds an extra $1,600-3,000 to the cost of childbirth. Paid maternity leave is associated with increased maternal and neonatal health, so offering paid leave could decrease these costs.

Though the overall labor force participation has declined since the year 2000, some economists argue that paid maternity leave in California has increased labor force participation among mothers. Mothers who receive paid maternity leave may be more likely to return to employment later, and then work more hours and earn higher wages. There is some evidence that the state paid maternity leave program in California saves businesses from needing to provide their own leave plans and financially stabilizes workers.

Less favorable maternity leave policies may inhibit a woman's career trajectory and promotion prospects. The extended period of absence of such policies often reduces a women's economic status and opportunities. During this hiatus, their job skills and experiences may deteriorate thus limiting their potential advancement.

Motherhood penalty

Available maternity leave options may also help lower the impact of children on career advancement, or the motherhood penalty. There currently exists a "family gap" between the pay of mothers and nonmothers. In the United States prior to the passage of the FMLA, mothers typically earned 70% of men's wages while nonmothers earned 90%. These earning disparities partially stemmed from insecure employment return prospects. Women without maternity leave protection were often forced to start over with a new employer following their absence. This interrupted their career progression and burdened them with the additional task of seeking new employment. Such factors ultimately impeded equitable access to income and career opportunities. Women as a group notably experience increasing income inequality as they age illustrating the impact of motherhood on their wage prospects. However, the implementation of FMLA addressed some of these impediments through the introduction of mandatory maternity leave. Mothers now are more likely to return to their previous employer due to this increased legal protection. The policy minimizes some of the negative externalities of motherhood by maintaining women's employment options even following maternity leave. Many policy experts though suspect that the remaining gender imbalance is largely attributable to the dearth of paid leave options. Women who worked for companies that provided paid maternity leave before they gave birth are more likely to take such leave for up to 12 weeks, and more likely to return to work more quickly thereafter.

Social

Access equality
Under the current FMLA system, approximately 40% of United States workers are ineligible for benefits due to the brevity of their tenure or the smallness of their firm. These excluded populations are often low-waged and minority women thus furthering their already present disadvantage. In 2016, 38% of white working mothers qualified for and could afford to take unpaid leave under FMLA compared with 30% of African American women and 25% of Hispanic women. Moreover, the unpaid aspect of the current policy limits access to those who are economically well off. The United States Department of Labor reported that over a 22-month period in 1999 and 2000, 3.5 million people needed leave but were unable to take it due to affordability concerns.  In the private sector, it was found that 12% of workers received paid paternity leave with 23% of workers in the highest-wage quartile receiving paid maternity leave versus 5% of workers in the lowest-wage quartile. The lack of monetary compensation may hinder the ability of women who are not as financially secure as others to balance employment with their family life. Upper-class women are more likely to take unpaid leave than lower-class women. In addition, more white women take unpaid maternity leave than black or Hispanic women. This imbalance contributes to the discrepancies in infant mortality between groups.

Access to parental leave for LGBTQ people 
Parental leave policy wordings may lead to lack of access for LGBTQ parents when there is a lack of gender neutral language and when the language in the policies emphasizes leave as available only for birth parents. Policies and researchers exploring parental leave policy may assume birth parents are female and non-birthing parents are male excluding transgender and non-binary parents and leading to them being denied access to leave by not being written into the policy contracts themselves. This kind of language can exclude adoptive parents, non-biological mothers, and gay fathers. A report looking at the parental leave policies of the 44 largest companies in the US found that only a minority offered policies that were inclusive of LGBTQ families. LGBTQ parents are also more likely to foster or adopt, two processes that often require longer time periods of parent-child bonding and can have uncertain timelines of care. These parents more than heterosexual ones are affected and denied important connection periods when there is a lack of inclusive parental leave policy. The decision for paid parental leave is left for approval from the organization, which may leave LGBTQ adoptive parents with limited or no formal leave. It is not common for there to be adoption benefits, in comparison with traditional birth leave. Paid parental leave may be more accessible by biological lesbian parents than by non-biological lesbian parents.

Paternity leave

California is the first state to offer paid paternity leave weeks (six weeks, partial payment). New Jersey, Rhode Island, and New York since passed laws for paid family leave. In the rest of the US, paternity pay weeks are not offered (therefore neither paternity paid leave weeks), but fathers have access to unpaid paternity leave to care for their newborns (without new income). Often, fathers will take sick days or vacation time when they have newborns. There is also a growing number of fathers that go unpaid. Some employers are required by law to allow 12 weeks of unpaid family leave after the birth or adoption of a child. This law is under FMLA or Family Medical Leave Act. Fathers who have access to paid paternity leave give mothers the opportunity to engage in paid work, with a positive effect on female labor force participation and wages. In 2015, a larger proportion of working fathers than mothers who requested leave received paid leave.

The United States military branches also show a minimal paternity leave. Although some branches give more time after the birth to take the leave, all branches give ten days. This type of leave is applicable to those who are married.

Research shows longer paternity leave increases the father's engagement with a child, which leads to the child's improved cognitive and mental health outcomes and fewer behavior problems. Studies have also found beneficial associations between paid paternal leave and mental health for first time parents.

COVID-19 impacts 
The COVID-19 pandemic has greatly impacted families all across the United States. A survey from S&P Global and AARP conveyed how families are engaged with taking care of their children from home for more hours than they are accustomed to since the onset of the pandemic. The Families First Coronavirus Response Act, or the FFCRA, was implemented in order to allow parents or guardians to be able to look after their children due to COVID-19 related issues. This act will allow employees up to 80 hours of paid sick leave or 10 weeks of paid family and medical leave in order for parents to care for their children. This act does not affect the FMLA, which stipulates the 12 weeks of unpaid parental leave. Home family structures look differently due to the pandemic and policies are needed to reflect this change in society. The 12 weeks of parental leave may no longer be a good fit for some families and may increase financial strain individuals are already enduring due to the pandemic.

Criticism

The United States is the only industrialized nation that does not offer paid parental leave. Of countries in the United Nations only the United States, Suriname, Papua New Guinea, and a few Pacific island countries do not provide paid time off for new parents either through the employer's benefits or government paid maternity and parental benefits. A study of 168 countries found that 163 guarantee paid leave to women, and 45 guarantee paid paternity leave.

The United States maternity leave policy is distinct for its relative scarcity of benefits in comparison to other industrialized countries. Thus, the legislation imposes relatively few restrictions on American firms and instead underscores employer discretion in the shaping of maternity leave policy. These firms are thus free to offer maternity leave policies on terms that are more aligned with corporate interests.  This United States policy differs greatly from most other western countries in terms of maternity leave provision. These stark maternity leave differentials are demonstrated in both the policy's length and compensation. The United States does not comply to international minimum standards. The Maternity Protection Convention, 2000 requires at least 14 weeks of maternity leave. In the European Union, the Pregnant Workers Directive requires at least 14 weeks of maternity leave; while the Work–Life Balance Directive requires at least 10 days of paternity leave, as well as at least 4 months of parental leave, with 2 months being non-transferable.

Studies show the current laws disproportionately impact minorities and low-income women, who are less likely to take unpaid leave. As of 2017, there had been no significant change in the proportion of women who received maternity leave in the past 20 years.

Although the United States does not guarantee paid maternity leave, employers may provide paid leave if they choose. 11 states—California, Colorado, Connecticut, Delaware, Massachusetts, Maryland, New Jersey, New York, Oregon, Rhode Island, and Washington—and the District of Columbia currently offer paid family and medical leave.

In the United States like other nations, child care is not always equally shared between mothers and fathers. In the United States, fathers can have some paid leaves if they live in California or other states with similar legislation  (partial paid leave). In contrast, Slovenian fathers have 12 weeks of 100% paid paternity leave. In Sweden, 480 days of 80% paid paternity leave weeks. In Norway, 49 weeks of 100% paid paternity leave weeks or 59 weeks of 80% paid paternity leave. Finnish fathers have 11 partial paid leave weeks.

While no existing laws explicitly prohibit LGBTQ+ people from taking parental leave in the United States, critics have noted that the Family Medical Leave Act (FMLA) doesn't provide adequate substantial financial support to LGBTQ+ parents. However, The U.S. Department of Labor has explicitly advised employers to grant workers in loco parentis child-related FMLA leave. This allows non-biological LGBTQ+ parents to have legal parental rights to a child. Many LGBTQ+ family advocates have demonstrated how the act excludes many low-income workers. Those looking to take federal family leave are only eligible if they have been in the service of their employer for 12 months. For low-income LGBTQ+ families, taking 12 weeks of unpaid leave creates a massive financial burden. LGBTQ+ parents and social justice activists have advocated for stronger federal, state, and local policy on paid parental leave, as a result of the existing complications with FMLA.

See also
 Maternity
 US labor law
 Work-life balance
 Working mothers

References

 
Family law
Maternity in the United States
United States labor law
Women in the United States